Worlds is the debut studio album by the American electronic music producer Porter Robinson, released on August 12, 2014 by Astralwerks in the United States and by Virgin EMI Records internationally. The album exhibits a shift in Robinson's music style from the heavy, bass-fueled complextro of his previous work to a more alternative form of electronic music.

Background
During 2012 and 2013, while touring extensively on his Language tour, the then 19-year-old producer began to grow increasingly tired of the current commercial EDM scene, feeling that it was inhibiting his creativity by being too formulaic, with the production process being centered around making "DJ friendly" tracks. He decided instead to create an album that was true to himself and that channeled his own feelings of nostalgia: particularly his interest in Japanese culture such as video games, anime and Vocaloids.

He remained quiet about the album's production for a long time throughout 2013 and the beginning of 2014, performing DJ sets at festivals through the summer. On March 3, 2014, during the Oscars, he unexpectedly released the first track from the album, "Sea of Voices", which was available on SoundCloud and emerged into a worldwide trend on Twitter. This was the first track to exhibit his drastic change in style from his previous material, showing off an ambient style. He feared a backlash from long time fans, however the single was generally well received. This song is also featured in the soundtrack of NHL 15 on PlayStation 4 and Xbox One.

On May 5, 2014, he announced the second single to be released from the album, "Sad Machine", to be released on May 13, 2014. This track was again a shift in style from "Sea of Voices", showing off a more typical EDM style, but used General MIDI sounds, similar to that heard in classic video games. The track utilized a Vocaloid, a heavily modified version of Avanna, modified by Robinson himself, for the vocals combined with his own vocals in a duet. Along with the release of the single, he also revealed the album would be released on August 12, 2014.

On June 3, 2014, he announced the third single from the album would be "Lionhearted", to be released on June 17, 2014 in the United States and later in the United Kingdom by August 3, 2014. This track again shifted styles to a more synth-pop style, aided by the vocals of indietronica band Urban Cone. A music video, directed by Jodeb was also released for the track. It features Robinson and a group of Japanese women walking around with weapons that turn objects into glitchy, retro effects.

On July 29, 2014, the album's fourth single, "Flicker", was released along with a music video. The video is seen from a train window as glitchy effects akin to the "Lionhearted" music video take place on the passing landscape.

On September 2, 2015, Porter Robinson announced a remix album of Worlds to be released on October 2, 2015. It contains one remix of each song by different artists including Slumberjack, San Holo, and Odesza.

Singles
The album's lead single, "Sea of Voices", was released on March 3, 2014 for digital download. The song entered the Dance/Electronic Songs chart at number 28. The second single, "Sad Machine", was released on May 13, 2014 and features a duet between Robinson and a Vocaloid. It entered the Dance/Electronic Songs chart at number 29. The album's third single, "Lionhearted" features vocals from Urban Cone and was released on June 17, 2014. The song premiered as Zane Lowe's Hottest Record in the World on BBC Radio 1. The fourth single from the album, "Flicker", was released on July 29, 2014. The song premiered during Robinson's Essential Mix for Radio 1. Robinson has described it as a "hip-hop beat and a vocal that’s Japanese and really high-pitched". He used a chopped up sample from translation software.

Tour and performances
Robinson has stated that he does not wish to perform DJ sets at festivals any more as he does not want to alienate his fans and confuse them. He instead planned to create a live show, using live instruments and sampling. He premiered his live show in Vancouver on the Worlds North American Tour, which he announced on 15 May 2014. The tour started on 28 August 2014 and ended on 18 October 2014. Robinson also visited Australia as a part of the tour, playing a series of dates around the country as a part of the Stereosonic tour.

Critical reception

Worlds has been met with generally positive reviews from music critics. At Metacritic, which assigns a normalized rating out of 100 to reviews from mainstream critics, the album received an average score of 63, based on 8 reviews, which indicates "generally favorable reviews."

Lucas Villa of AXS awarded Worlds with four out of five stars, writing, "[Robinson] taps into inspirations from video games and Japanese culture to deliver beautiful soundscapes full of emotional depth and electronic grandeur."

Larry Fitzmaurice of Pitchfork gave the album a 6.9 out of 10, stating "Finding a middle ground between the synthetic surge of big-tent dance music and the tart melodic tendencies of Passion Pit, Robinson’s debut album drives home the reality that mainstream electronic music carries a certain sensitivity found in chart-topping smashes, zeitgeist-capturing Ultra Fest main-stagers, and sneakily successful soft-beat auteurs alike."  He praised the tracks "Hear the Bells" and "Sea of Voices." noting that "Together, 'Hear the Bells' and 'Sea of Voices' make for two of the most transportive electro-pop singles of this year, a pair of unabashedly huge songs that, when caught in the right light, carry the potential to strike a personal chord for anyone who’s ever felt alive while looking at a city skyline at night."

Elissa Stolman of Rolling Stone gave the album a 3.5 out of 5 stars, stating "Although it doesn’t sound quite like EDM, Worlds manages to retain the thrilling rush of emotions that the best raves inspire."

A more mixed review came of Consequence of Sounds Derek Staples, who commented on the album by saying "The idea of a new EDM renaissance is noble, but Robinson’s execution is frail."

Accolades
The album was ranked as the ninety-seventh greatest album of the 2010s and the fifteenth-greatest dance album of the 2010s by Billboard staff in November 2019.

Track listing

Notes
 "Sea of Voices" features uncredited vocals from Breanne Düren.
 "Sad Machine", "Fresh Static Snow", and "Goodbye to a World" feature vocals from Avanna, a Vocaloid voice.
 "Flicker" contains samples from Ano Natsu de Matteru, produced by Natsumachi Production Committee.
 "Hear the Bells" contains samples from "Bells of Cologne" by Imaginary Cities.
 "Fellow Feeling" features uncredited vocals from Amanda Lee.

Chart positions

References

2014 debut albums
Porter Robinson albums
Albums produced by Porter Robinson
Astralwerks albums